Attorney General Lynch may refer to:

B. L. Lynch (1830–?), Attorney General of Louisiana
Loretta Lynch (born 1959), Attorney General of the United States
Patrick Lynch (Irish attorney general) (1866–1947), Attorney General of Ireland
Patrick Lynch (Rhode Island attorney general) (born 1965), Attorney General of Rhode Island
Thomas C. Lynch (1904–1986), Attorney General of California

See also
General Lynch (disambiguation)